Reginald Carter (1 March 1888 – 16 July 1970) was an Australian cricketer. He played three first-class matches for Western Australia in 1909/10.

See also
 List of Western Australia first-class cricketers

References

External links
 

1888 births
1970 deaths
Australian cricketers
Western Australia cricketers
Cricketers from Melbourne